Nicola Mary Pagett Scott (15 June 1945 – 3 March 2021), known professionally as Nicola Pagett, was a British actress, known for her role as Elizabeth Bellamy in the 1970s TV drama series Upstairs, Downstairs (1971–1973), as well as being one of the leads in the sitcom Ain't Misbehavin' (1994–1995). Her film appearances included Anne of the Thousand Days (1969), Frankenstein: The True Story (1973), Operation Daybreak (1975), Privates on Parade (1982) and An Awfully Big Adventure (1995).

Early life 
Born in Cairo, Egypt, Nicola Pagett spent most of her childhood out of Britain—in Hong Kong, Cyprus and Japan, the family moving with her father who worked for a major oil company. She was educated at Saint Maur International School, in Yokohama, Japan. In 1962 Pagett entered Britain's Royal Academy of Dramatic Art where she studied for two years.

Career 
In 1964, Pagett appeared in several productions with Worthing Repertory Company and the Glasgow Citizen's Theatre. Then her performance in the television play The Girl in the Picture caught the attention of Sir Robert Helpmann who cast her to tour with Vivien Leigh in the stage play La Contessa.

In 1965, she appeared in the Incorporated Television Company (ITC) production of Gideon's Way, episode 10, "How to Retire without Really Working" in an uncredited role as girl at railway station. Also in 1965, under the name Nicola Paget, she appeared in Gideon's Way series 1 episode 15 called "The Alibi Man".

She also appeared in the British TV series, Danger Man, in an episode called 'The Mirror's New'. She appeared in episode 13 of The Persuaders! and episode 7 of Special Branch.

After starring as Florence Maybrick in an episode of Wicked Women, she appeared as Elizabeth Bellamy in the British series Upstairs, Downstairs.

This was followed in 1975 by an appearance in the British television police drama, The Sweeney. Pagett appeared in the episode Stoppo Driver in which she played the character of Sara Prince, part of a family of criminals involved in the kidnap of the wife of Detective Constable Brian Cooney, a Flying Squad driver. In May 1976, she appeared as Bella Manningham in Gas Light at the Criterion Theatre, London, with Peter Vaughan and Anton Rodgers.

She played the title role in the 1977 BBC adaptation of Anna Karenina and gave a memorable performance in David Nobbs's TV series A Bit of a Do. She appeared in films such as The Viking Queen (1967), Come Back Peter (1969), Anne of the Thousand Days (1969), There's a Girl in My Soup (1970), Frankenstein: The True Story (1973), Operation Daybreak (1975), Oliver's Story (1978), Privates on Parade (1982) and An Awfully Big Adventure (1995). She appeared in leading roles (as the young Irish bride Conor) in the 1980 Australian mini-series The Timeless Land and in the 1994 to 1995 sitcom Ain't Misbehavin'.

Personal life
Pagett married actor/writer Graham Swannell in 1975. They had one daughter. The couple divorced in 1997.

Pagett was diagnosed with bipolar disorder in 1997 after becoming obsessed with the then prime minister's chief press secretary Alastair Campbell. She related in her book Diamonds Behind My Eyes that she later recovered.

Pagett died on 3 March 2021, aged 75, after suffering from a brain tumour.

References

External links 
 

1945 births
2021 deaths
English film actresses
English stage actresses
English television actresses
Actresses from Cairo
Alumni of RADA
20th-century English actresses
People with bipolar disorder
Deaths from brain cancer in England